The Idaho Army National Guard is a component of the United States Army and the United States National Guard.  Nationwide, the Army National Guard comprises approximately one half of the US Army's available combat forces and approximately one third of its support organization.  National coordination of various state National Guard units are maintained through the National Guard Bureau.

Idaho Army National Guard units are trained and equipped as part of the United States Army.  The same ranks (both enlisted and officer) and insignia are used and National Guardsmen are eligible to receive all United States military awards. The Idaho Guard also bestows a number of state awards for local services rendered in or to the state of Idaho.

The Militia Act of 1903 organized the various state militias into the present National Guard system.

Formerly attached to the Idaho National Guard NGB regulations 10-4 and United States code chapter 32 section 109 was the Idaho State Guard which was created to replace the Idaho National Guard when they were in federal service and not available for the protection of the state.

History
Soldiers from the Idaho National Guard have been deployed to Afghanistan.

In late November 2020, the Idaho National Guard have helped with COVID-19 screening and testing services, during a third wave of coronavirus infection. The Idaho National Guard has also helped to administrate nearly 100,000 COVID-19 vaccines.

Units

116th Cavalry Brigade Combat Team, Gowen Field, Boise, Idaho
1st Battalion (Combined Arms), 163rd Cavalry Regiment (Montana)
2nd Battalion (Combined Arms), 116th Cavalry Regiment
3rd Battalion (Combined Arms), 116th Cavalry Regiment (Oregon)
1st Squadron (Armored Reconnaissance), 221st Cavalry Regiment (Nevada)
1st Battalion, 148th Field Artillery Regiment
 116th Brigade Engineer Battalion
 145th Brigade Support Battalion
State Aviation Group
1st Battalion (Assault Helicopter), 183rd Aviation Regiment (Sikorsky UH-60 Black Hawk)
Detachment 35, Joint Operational Support Airlift Center (C-12)
Air Ambulance Detachment (Lakota)
Detachment 2, Company C, 1st Battalion (Medevac), 168th Aviation Regiment
204th Regiment (Regional Training Institute) (RTI)
 1st Battalion,
 2nd Battalion,
 Regional Training Site - Maintenance Ordnance Training Battalion (RTS-M)
25th Army Band

In popular culture
The "Divided We Fall" trilogy by Trent Reedy is written about a member of the Idaho Army National Guard during a Second American Civil War.

The book "Against All Enemies" by Harold Coyle centers around the Idaho National Guard.

See also
 Idaho State Guard

References

External links

 
 GlobalSecurity.org Idaho Army National Guard, accessed 20 Nov 2006

Idaho National Guard
Military in Idaho
United States Army National Guard by state